Dyras is an internationally registered brand for household appliances, consumer electronics and wellness/body care products. Dyras products are manufactured under license by The Global Electric Factory Inc., USA. The products are distributed worldwide with a focus on Europe.

History of the Dyras Group

1978–1988
The first corporation of the group, the Dyras GmbH & Co. KG, was founded in Nuremberg, Germany in 1978. It achieved its first successes with the development and production of interface adapters for long-distance data transmission, followed by the development and implementation of an OEM product range for consumer electronics.

In 1983, Dyras issued its first illustrated catalogue offering more than 2500 products including measuring instruments, consumer electronics, components, electromechanical parts, assembly kits and groups, tools, electric appliances and books.
 
In 1984, Dyras launched its new audio line comprising a multi-band stereo receiver with cassette recorder and linear-phase loudspeaker boxes both manufactured in Japan.

1988–1998
Reacting to the political changes and economic upheavals in the late eighties and early nineties, the group was relocated from Germany to the United States. Manufacturing operations in Central and Eastern Europe, Japan, Korea, and Taiwan were closed and switched to China. As a consequence of the transformation processes in Central and Eastern Europe whole industries disappeared, leading to the loss of customers of electronic industrial products in this region. The Dyras product range was adapted correspondingly, in order to cope with this loss and the changing conditions.

In 1989, Dyras founded a branch in Budapest responsible for the Central and Eastern European market.

1998–2008
From 1999 on, a new branch in Budapest, Dyras wwe.trading Kft. (= Ltd.), undertook the task of being sole importer, distributor and service center for Dyras brand products in Central and Eastern Europe. Besides marketing and further promoting the brand, its responsibilities included monitoring the relevant markets, assessing consumer trends and competitors. The products were primarily distributed to multinationals such as Auchan, KIKA, Metro, Penny Market, Praktiker, Rossmann and Tesco.

2008 - Present 
After 8 years of successful distribution of Dyras brand products, the sales area now covers 64 million inhabitants in Central-East Europe, as well as 96 million inhabitants in the German speaking Central European area.

The Dyras product portfolio was given a newly structured, revised gift box design equipped with all the local languages of the distribution area.

In 2015, the exclusive distribution rights for Dyras branded products for Europe were assigned to MarketDome Zrt. (=Co. Ltd.).

Current products
The composition of the product range as well as design and features are tailored to meet the specific requirements of the respective markets.

The current product range includes the following product groups:
 small electric kitchen appliances
 household appliances
 consumer electronics
 wellness and body care products
medical measuring instruments  
cooling and heating appliances

External links
 Main website

References

Companies based in Miami
Electronics companies of the United States